Saving Pushkin, also known as Saving Legacy is a 2021 Russian war drama film directed by Igor Ugolnikov. The main roles were played by Sergey Bezrukov and Nastassja Kerbengen.

It was released on October 21, 2021 by Sony Pictures Productions and Releasing (SPPR).

Plot 
The film is set in 1944 at the Mikhaylovskoye Museum Reserve in the village of Mikhailovskoye. Some of the local residents became a partisan, another began to cooperate with the invaders, and left-handed Sergey did not choose any side and decided to just wait. Suddenly, a professor of literature, Maria Schiller, arrives from Germany. She tells the Wehrmacht soldiers and local residents about Alexander Pushkin. Meanwhile, an order comes from Berlin - to remove all historical values from the village.

Cast 
 Sergey Bezrukov as Sergey Trofimov, rural left-hander
 Nastassja Kerbengen as Frau Maria Schiller
 Fyodor Bondarchuk as Bespalov, the commander of the partisan detachment
 Igor Ugolnikov as Antipov, museum employee
 Anastasiya Melnikova as Lyudmila Antipova, Antipov's wife
 Mikhael Epp as Major Zangler
 Anastasiya Butkova as Anisya, a resident of the village
 Aleksey Nesterov as Amel
 Igor Savochkin as Yegor, partisan
 Dmitry Solomykin as Zangler's adjutant
 Konstantin Fisenko as Dyoma, partisan
 Andrey Gorbachev as Yupatov
 Andrey Nekrasov as Voronin

Production 
The distribution of Ugolnikov's picture is handled by the Russian film company Sony Pictures Productions and Releasing (SPPR), which has released films such as Petrov's Flu on the big screens.

Filming 
Principal photography took place in 2019 on the territory of Pushkinskiye Gory. The authorities of the Pskov Oblast provided direct assistance in choosing locations for the film.

References

External links 
 

2021 films
2020s Russian-language films
2021 war drama films
Russian war drama films
Russian World War II films
Lenfilm films